"Don't Go Away Mad (Just Go Away)" is a song by Mötley Crüe. It is the tenth track from their 1989 album Dr. Feelgood and was released as the album's fourth single in May 1990. It peaked at #19 on the Billboard Hot 100 and #13 on the Mainstream rock charts.

Bassist Nikki Sixx told Rolling Stone: "I saw that line in a movie somewhere, I can't even remember what movie. I thought, 'Great idea for a song.' A little tongue in cheek. A little sarcasm there." Vocalist Vince Neil added: "I love to play guitar and sing that song. It's kind of a feel-good song. When that song comes on everybody wants to sing along with you." This song also contains lyrical references to 1984's "Too Young to Fall in Love". The phrase "Don't go away mad, just go away" is also used in the song "Just Go Away" on Blondie's 1978 album Parallel Lines.

Music video
The music video shows Neil leaving New York City to join his bandmates in Los Angeles for rehearsal. Produced by Sharon Oreck through O Pictures, "Don't Go Away Mad" is the second of two Crüe videos to be directed by Mary Lambert under the alias "Blanche White" ("blanche" meaning "white" in French).

The song's video was placed on The New York Times list of the 15 Essential Hair-Metal Videos.

Reception
In Guitar World's "Top 20 Hair Metal Albums" article, the reviewer said that “Don’t Go Away Mad (Just Go Away)”, along with “Dr. Feelgood”, “Kickstart My Heart”, and “She Goes Down”, were, "as good as pop metal ever got."

Personnel
 Vince Neil - lead vocals, rhythm guitar
 Mick Mars - lead guitar, backing vocals
 Nikki Sixx - bass guitar, backing vocals
 Tommy Lee - drums, backing vocals

Charts

References

External links

1990 singles
1980s ballads
Elektra Records singles
Mötley Crüe songs
Glam metal ballads
Songs written by Mick Mars
Songs written by Nikki Sixx
1989 songs
Song recordings produced by Bob Rock